Bernabé de Ayala (1625-1689) was a Spanish painter.

Life
He was born at Jerez de la Frontera in the beginning of the 17th century, studied under Zurbarán and imitated his manner in his tints and draperies. No doubt many of his pictures are now mistaken for the work of his master. He was one of the founders of the Academy at Seville in 1660, and was a member of it until 1671; but as his name does not appear with the subscribers to the statutes in 1673, it is supposed that his death occurred between those years. The Museum of Seville has six of his works, and there are others in the churches of that city and of Madrid.

Notes

References
 Kinkead, Duncan T., Pintores y doradores en Sevilla 1650–1699. Documentos, Bloomington In., AuthorHouse, 2006, 
 Pérez Sánchez, Alfonso E., Pintura barroca en España 1600–1750, Madrid, Ediciones Cátedra, 1992, 

Attribution:
 

1625 births
1678 deaths
People from Seville
17th-century Spanish painters
Spanish male painters